The Kachin Defense Army (abbreviated KDA) was an armed insurgent group that operated in northern Shan State, Myanmar, until its conversion into a border guard force in January 2010.

History
The KDA was formerly the 4th brigade of the Kachin Independence Army (KIA), until it split from its parent organisation, the Kachin Independence Organisation (KIO), and moved their headquarters to Kawnghka, Kutkai Township, Shan State. After the Mong Tai Army disbanded, the KDA gained some of their abandoned territory.

In 2010, the KDA accepted a proposal by the State Peace and Development Council, the then governing body of Myanmar, to transform into a "border guard force". The proposal was intended to bring security to local Kachin people under the KDA's governing, but instead led to the disarmament of 1,500 KDA members. The KDA surrendered their heavy weapons and mortars to the Northeastern Regional Command, in accordance to the "conversion process". The group was also split into two smaller factions, with 100 members in each group.

See also
 Kachin Independence Organisation
 Kachin Independence Army
 New Democratic Army - Kachin

References

Rebel groups in Myanmar
History of Myanmar
Politics of Myanmar
Paramilitary organisations based in Myanmar
Kachin people